Gao Xin (born 22 February 1997) is a Chinese footballer currently playing as a defender for Jinhua Huayue.

Career statistics

Club
.

References

1997 births
Living people
Chinese footballers
Association football defenders
China League One players
Shandong Taishan F.C. players
Beijing Sport University F.C. players
21st-century Chinese people